Choriaster is monotypic genus in the family Oreasteridae containing the single species Choriaster granulatus commonly known as the granulated sea star.  Other common names include big-plated sea star and doughboy starfish. This species is harmless to humans.

Description 
Choriaster granulatus is a large sea star with a convex body and five short arms. The arms have rounded tips, making it appear "chubby", leading to one of its common names being "the doughboy starfish". It is most commonly pale pink in colour with brown papillae radiating out from the centre but can also be colours ranging from grey to yellow and even red.

Location 
This species is found in numerous tropical waters, including:
 East Africa
 Indo-Pacific region
 Great Barrier Reef
 Red Sea
 Vanuatu
 Fiji
 Papua New Guinea

Habitat 

Choriaster granulatus has been found individually or in groups along coral reefs in the Indo-West Pacific region. It has also been found in the Red Sea, Fiji, and Great Barrier Reef. The sandy habitat where it tends to live is characterized by rubble slopes and detritus. They have also been found among corals and sponges.

Diet 
Choriaster granulatus is a carnivore that, like other sea stars, has its mouth on the underside of its body. Food is digested and absorbed outside of its body by forcing its stomach out of its mouth onto the food. Its food includes small invertebrates such as coral polyps as well as carrion.

Life cycle and reproduction 
Sea star embryos hatch into planktonic larvae before becoming juvenile sea stars with five arms. The Asteroidea class of organisms reproduce use both asexually and sexually.

Threats 
The arms of Choriaster granulatus can become deformed when small parasitic limpets attach to their underside. They are also threatened by habitat loss due to ocean acidification which can lead to coral bleaching.

References

External links 
 

Oreasteridae
Animals described in 1842